Bit, byte, gebissen was a German radio program. It was the first program on computer topics, produced by the Bayerischer Rundfunk (Bavarian Broadcasting). Bit, byte, gebissen was broadcast from October 1985 to September 1993.

The idea was of the radio program was born out of the boom of home computers and video game consoles starting to fascinate youngsters at the beginning of the 1980s. Another successful program on computer topics for adolescent radio listeners was Chippie from the Hessischer Rundfunk (Hessian Broadcasting), starting in 1990.

External links
Die Zündfunk-Hall-of-Fame: Das erste Computermagazin 

1985 radio programme debuts
1993 radio programme endings
German talk radio programs
Science radio programmes
Bayerischer Rundfunk